Nathaniel Makoto Uematsu (植松 誠 ナタナエル) is the current Anglican Bishop of  the diocese of Hokkaidō, Japan and was the Primate of the Nippon Sei Ko Kai, the Province of the Anglican Communion in Japan, until November 2020.

Uematsu became Primate on 23 May 2006 having previously worked as a curate at St. Marks in Ashiya, Osaka, as Rector at Holy Trinity in the same city, and as General Secretary of the Provincial Office of the Nippon Sei Ko Kai.

Uematsu is a 1982 Master of Divinity graduate of the Episcopal Theological Seminary of the Southwest in Austin, Texas.

References

External links
Website of the Anglican Diocese of Hokkaidō (in Japanese)
Website of the Anglican Diocese of Hokkaidō (English version)

21st-century Anglican bishops in Asia
Anglican Primates of the Nippon Sei Ko Kai
Japanese Anglican bishops
Living people
1952 births
Anglican bishops of Hokkaido